Athletes from Burma competed at the 1988 Summer Olympics in Seoul, South Korea.  The nation sent a small delegation of two athletes and three officials.

A military coup occurred in Burma during 8888 Uprising, the day after the Games' opening ceremony. Burma's athletes competed nonetheless, but the country was then absent from the 1988 Summer Paralympics, held just after the Olympics.

Competitors
The following is the list of number of competitors in the Games.

Athletics

Women
Track & road events

References

Nations at the 1988 Summer Olympics
1988
Olympics